The Talaud Islands Regency is a regency of North Sulawesi province, Indonesia. The Talaud Islands form an archipelago situated to the north-east of Sulawesi, with a land area of 1,251.02 km2. It had a population of 83,434 at the 2010 Census, increasing to 94,520 at the 2020 Census. The largest island is Karakelong, on which lies the regency seat in the town of Melonguane. To its south lie the islands of Salibabu and Kabaruan, while the Nanusa group lies to the northeast of Karakelong, and Miangas island is situated midway between Karakelong and the Philippines. It is one of the three regencies to the north of North Sulawesi that are located between Sulawesi and the Philippines, along with the Sitaro Islands Regency and Sangihe Islands Regency. The island of Miangas is the most northerly island in the regency and widely regarded as the northernmost point of Indonesia. As the result, it is often referenced to describe the territorial integrity of Indonesia in various patriotic statements and songs together with Sabang, Merauke, and Rote Island.

History 
The islands were known as Maleon, Sinduane, Tamarongge, Batunampato, and Tinonda. Human settlements in the region have been present since prehistoric time, shown by several artifacts of hand axe and chopper from 6,000 BC. There were also remains of chinaware, suggesting there has been continuous trading activity between the natives of the islands and outside world.

It was thought that inhabitants of the islands were originated from Southern Philippines especially Mindanao and also traders from Ternate.

Governance

Administrative districts 
The Regency is divided into nineteen districts (kecamatan), tabulated below with their areas and their populations at the 2010 Census and 2020 Census.

Economy 
The regency's GRDP was valued at 2,266 billion rupiahs in 2020, an increase of 59 billion rupiahs from previous year. The regency's economy is still dominated by agriculture, fishing, and forestry-related industries. The agriculture sector alone made up 42.57% of the regency's GRDP. The second biggest sector in the regency was trade and retail, which made up 13.22% of the regency's GRDP in 2020. Other significant sectors are construction with contribution of 11.64%, administration and social security with 11.58%, and transportation with 4.50%. Overall economic growth of the regency was 4.69% on 2019 but then declined to 0.43% on 2020.

The fastest growing sector in the regency in 2020 was electricity and gas with growth of 9.14%, followed by health sector with growth of 8.93%, insurance and financial services with 7.55%, and information and communication sector with 7.01%. Food services sector experienced sharp decline of 9.03% on the same year, while transportation sector also declined 5.34% due to COVID-19 pandemic.

There were 1,635 registered merchants classified as small-scale business, while 26 merchant business were classified as medium-sized as of 2020. In addition, there are 150 registered cooperatives on the same year in the regency. Leading agriculture product from the regency is banana, with output of 34,384 quintals in 2020. Other fruit produced by the regency is mango with 913 quintals, durian with 509 quintals, papaya with 9,046 quintals, and salak with 297 quintals. Other than banana, coconut is also a major cash crop in the regency which coconut plantation occupied 22,146 hectares of land as of 2020. The production of coconut in 2020 was 19,185 tons, followed by nutmeg production of 4,113 tons. There's also significant chili production which results in 59,917 tons as of 2020.

Demographics

Infrastructure

Education 
There are 74 kindergartens, 117 elementary schools, 43 junior high schools, and 24 senior high schools, in addition of 13 vocational high schools. From the 24 senior high schools, five of them are Christian senior high school (SMAK) which is administrated under Ministry of Religious Affairs instead of Ministry of Education, Culture, Research, and Technology.

There's only one college in the regency, Rajawali Computer Science College which is private. It was established after MoU between the regency government and IPB University in 2006. The main campus was previously located in a temporary location in Melonguane town, but later relocated to town of Beo in 2011 where newly built campus complex was located.

Healthcare 
There are two main hospitals, 42 puskesmas, and 6 registered pharmacies in the regency. From the 42 puskesmas, there are 17 with inpatient care. There are also 153 healthcare centers in the regency as of 2020. Talaud Regional Hospital, which is the main hospital of the regency, is located at the town of Melonguane and classified by Ministry of Health as C-class hospital. The other hospital is located at town of Gemeh, is RSB Gemeh Talaud which has smaller building and classified as D-class hospital.

Transportation 

Total length of road in the regency as of 2020 was 470.771 kilometers out of which 265.44 kilometers are sealed with asphalt and 38.147 kilometers were gravel surface. Almost half of the roads are under the authority of the regency government, while the other half are under the authority of the province. Only 66.05 kilometers are under direct authority of the central government. The main port in the regency is Melonguane Port, located in the town of Melonguane. It is connected to other smaller ports scattered around the regency as well as big ports in mainland Sulawesi by Sea Toll Program. In addition, the Melonguane Port also host an Indonesian Navy naval base.

The regency is mainly served by Melangguane Airport, which has regular flight to Manado. There's also recently built Miangas Airport serving the island of Miangas which has flights to Manado and also Melonguane. It is one of the most remote airports in Indonesia and was inaugurated by Joko Widodo in 2017. As of 2021, there's one proposed airport that would be built in Marampit, which has been approved by Ministry of National Development Planning.

References 

Regencies of North Sulawesi